Moshé Raviv-Vorobeichic, known as Moi Ver, born  Moses Vorobeichic (1904–1995) was an Israeli photographer and painter.

Life and work
Moi Ver (Moshe Raviv) was born in 1904 in Vilnius, Lithuania as Moses Vorobeichic.  He initially studied painting. In his early twenties he matriculated at the Bauhaus, taking courses with Paul Klee, Wassily Kandinsky, and Josef Albers, and left from there to attend the Ecole Photo One in Paris.

In his book Moi Ver: Paris, he produced avant-garde photomontages. Originally published in 1931 by Editions Jeanne Walter with an introduction by futurist Fernand Léger.

In 1932 Raviv was sent by the weekly La Vie Parisienne to Palestine as photo-reporter. Raviv illustrated many books. Raviv was a founder of the Artists' Colony in Safed.

He adopted Zionism in 1934 and immigrated to what was then known as Palestine. Moshe Raviv-Vorobeichic (as he called himself in Israel) focused more on painting than photography and lived in Safed until his death in 1995.

Education
 Graduated from the first Hebrew Gymnasium in the Diaspora
 Art and architecture, Vilnius University
 1928 Bauhaus, Dessau, Germany with Paul Klee, Wassily Kandinsky, and Josef Albers
 1930 Ecole Photo One, Paris, photography

References

External links
 
 
 
 
 Special Collection of Posters at the Palestine Poster Project Archives.

1904 births
1995 deaths
Bauhaus alumni
Israeli photographers
Photographers from Vilnius
20th-century Israeli painters
Early photographers in Palestine
Lithuanian emigrants to Mandatory Palestine